Hans-Jürgen Schatz (born October 10, 1958 in Berlin, Germany) is a German television actor.

Awards and honors 
 2007 Bundesverdienstkreuz am Bande (Federal Cross of Merit)

Filmography
 Breakthrough, 1979
 Lulu, 1980
 Die Weiße Rose, 1982
 Derrick - Season 08, Episode 09: "Der Untermieter" (1981)
 Derrick - Season 09, Episode 08: "Der Mann aus Kiel" (1982)
 Derrick - Season 11, Episode 02: "Die Verführung" (1984)
 Ein Fall für zwei, 1984
 Der Fahnder, 1985–1993
 The Rose Garden, 1989
 Salto Postale, 1993
 Immenhof, 1994
 , 1995
 , 1999
 Wolffs Revier, 1992, 2002

References

External links

Personal Site 
ZBF Agency Berlin 

1958 births
Living people
German male television actors
Male actors from Berlin
Recipients of the Cross of the Order of Merit of the Federal Republic of Germany